Dudding Hill railway station was a station in Neasden, London NW2 on the Dudding Hill Line.

The station was opened in 1875 by the Midland Railway, originally as "Dudding Hill, for Willesden & Neasden". It closed to passengers in 1902, despite providing access to the neighbouring new Gladstone Park, and goods services ceased in 1964. Although the platforms were demolished, the station building survived into the 1980s, when the land was used for housing (Cornmow Drive was built on the site).

The Dudding Hill Line offers a connection between the North London Line at Acton and the Midland Main Line at Brent Cross and Cricklewood. It is now only used for freight, but has recently been incorporated into the proposed West London Orbital railway.

References

External links 
 Subterranea Britannica: Disused Stations Site Record: Dudding Hill

Disused railway stations in the London Borough of Brent
Former Midland Railway stations
Railway stations in Great Britain opened in 1875
Railway stations in Great Britain closed in 1888
Railway stations in Great Britain opened in 1893
Railway stations in Great Britain closed in 1902